The following is a list of the works of the Finnish composer Leevi Madetoja. In total, his oeuvre comprises 82 works with opus numbers and about 40 without. While Madetoja composed in all genres, he found his greatest success with the orchestra: symphonies, operas, cantatas, and orchestral miniatures all flowed from his pen. Curiously, he composed no concerti, although at various times in his career he hinted at plans for a violin concerto. Madetoja was also an accomplished composer for voice, as his numerous choral pieces and songs for voice and piano evidence; he found less success with—and composed sparingly for—solo piano. Finally, Madetoja wrote little for chamber ensemble after his student years, although it is unclear if this was due to insufficient skill or waning interest in the genre.

Today, Madetoja is primarily remembered for his set of three symphonies (1916, 1918, and 1926, respectively); two operas, The Ostrobothnians (1924) and Juha (1935); the ballet-pantomime, Okon Fuoko (1927); the Elegia from the Symphonic Suite (1909); the Kalevalic symphonic poem, Kullervo (1913); and, The Garden of Death (1918, r. 1919), a three-movement suite for solo piano. In the inventory that follows, the dates provided indicate the year of composition, unless otherwise preceded by an "r.", for revision; an "a.", for arrangement; or, an "fp.", for first performance. Where possible, names in the original Finnish are included, with English translations in parentheses.

At present, this list is incomplete, particularly in the songs and choral works subsections.

Works for orchestra

Symphonies 
 Op. 29: Symphony No. 1 in F major (1914–16); fp. 10 February 1916, Madetoja and Helsinki PO
 
 
 
 Op. 35: Symphony No. 2 in E-flat major (1916–18); fp. 17 December 1918, Robert Kajanus and Helsinki PO
 
 
 
 
 Op. 55: Symphony No. 3 in A major (1925–26); fp. 8 April 1926, Madetoja and Helsinki PO
 
 
 
 
 (Lost): Symphony No. 4 (1930–38); reportedly lost in 1938 at a Paris railway station when Madetoja's suitcase was stolen

Stage 
 Op. 5: Shakkipeli (Chess), incidental music to a play by Eino Leino (1910); fp. 15 February 1910, Madetoja & Apostol's Concert Orchestra
 
 
 
 
 Op. 45: Pohjalaisia (The Ostrobothnians), opera in 3 acts for soloists and orchestra; libretto by Madetoja, based on a play by Artturi Järviluoma (1918–23); fp. 25 October 1924, Finnish National Opera, Tauno Hannikainen & Helsinki PO
 Op. 58: Okon Fuoko, ballet-pantomime in 1 act for soprano, tenor, mixed chorus, and orchestra; libretto by Poul Knudsen (1925–27); fp. 12 February 1930, Finnish National Opera,  & Helsinki PO
 Op. 74: Juha, opera in 3 acts (or 6 tableaux) for soloists and orchestra; libretto by Aino Ackté and Madetoja, based on a novel by Juhani Aho (1930–34); fp. 17 February 1935, Finnish National Opera, Armas Järnefelt & Helsinki PO

Excerpted suites 
 Op. 52: Sarja oopperasta Pohjalaisia (The Ostrobothnians Suite), arranged from the opera by Madetoja (a. 1923); fp. 8 March 1923, Kajanus & Bergen SO
 
 
 
 
 
 Op. 58: Sarja I musiikista balettiin Okon Fuoko (Okon Fuoko Suite No. 1), arranged from the ballet-pantomime by Madetoja (a. 1927); fp. 15 December 1927, Kajanus & Helsinki PO
 
 
 
 
 
 
 Op. 74: Sarja oopperasta Juha (Juha Suite), arranged from the opera by Madetoja (a. 1934); fp: ?

Other (without voice or chorus) 
 Op. 4: Sinfoninen sarja (Symphonic Suite) (1909–10); fp. I: 10 January 1910, Kajanus & Helsinki PO; I–IV: 26 September 1910, Madetoja & Helsinki PO
 
 
 
 
 Op. 7: Konserttialkusoitto (Concert Overture) (1911); fp. 14 October 1913, Madetoja & Helsinki PO
 Op. 11: Tanssinäky (Dance Vision), originally titled Öinen karkelokuva (Night Revels) (1911, r. 1919); fp. 24 October 1912, Madetoja & Helsinki PO
 Op. 12: Pieni sarja (Little Suite), composer's arrangement of Six Pieces for Piano (a. 1913–16); fp. I–III: 14 October 1913, Madetoja & Helsinki PO; IV–V: 5 March 1916, Madetoja & Viipuri Orchestra
 
 
 
 
 
 Op. 15: Kullervo, symphonic poem (1913); fp. 14 October 1913, Madetoja & Helsinki PO
Op. 17: Melodia ja Pieni romanssi (Melody and Little Romance), for strings, composer's arrangement of Piano Pieces (a. 1913); fp. 14 October 1913, Madetoja & Helsinki PO
 
 
 Op. 34: Pastoraalisarja orkesterille (Pastorale Suite for Orchestra), composer's arrangement of Pastorale Suite for Piano (a. 1931?); fp. 29 December 1931, Toivo Haapanen & Finnish RSO
 
 
 
 
 Op. 53: Huvinäytelmäalkusoitto (Comedy Overture), overture to an abandoned opera, Nummisuutarit (1923); fp. 12 April 1923, Madetoja & Helsinki PO
 Op. 67b: Barcarola (Barcarole), composer's arrangement of Barcarole for brass ensemble (a. ?); fp.?
 Op. 77: Maalaiskuvia (Rural Pictures), suite from music to the film  (1936); fp. 4 March 1999, Arvo Volmer & Oulu SO

Cantatas 
 Op. 10: Merikoski, cantata (for the 300th anniversary of Oulu City Schools) for mixed choir and orchestra, with text by V. A. Koskenniemi; composer's arrangement of Merikoski for mixed choir and piano (a. 1911); fp. ?
 
 
 
 
 
 
 Op. 47 (partially lost): Elämän päivät (The Days of Life), cantata for soprano, mixed choir, and orchestra with text by V. A. Koskenniemi (1920); fp. 15 February 1920, Madetoja, Helsinki PO, Suomen Laulu, & Aino Ackté (soprano)
 
 
 
 
 
 
 Op. 48 (partially lost): Napuen sankarien muistolle (To the Memory of the Heroes of Napue), cantata (in commemoration of the Battle of Isoviha) for unison choir and brass ensemble, with text by A. V. Koskimies (1920); fp. 10 July 1920
 Op. 59: Planeettain laulu (The Song of the Planets), cantata (for the promotion ceremony at the University of Turku) for soprano, mixed choir, and orchestra, with text by V. A. Koskenniemi (1927); fp. Turku, 12 May 1927, Madetoja & Helsinki PO
 
 
 
 
 
 Op. 63: Lux triumphans, cantata (for the centenary of the University of Helsinki) for soprano, mixed choir, and orchestra, with text by Otto Manninen (1928); fp. 1 October 1928, Madetoja, Helsinki PO, & Suomen Laulu
 
 
 
Copenhagen, 2 June 1929,  & Suomen Laulu; fp. in Finland, 6 March 1930, Madetoja, Helsinki PO, & Suomen Laulu
 
 
 
 
 
 
 Op. 73: Karitsan lippu, cantata (for the inauguration of the bishop of the Diocese of Tampere) for baritone, mixed choir, and organ, with text by L. Pohjanpää (1934); fp. Tampere, 10 June 1934, Choir of the Tampere Cathedral
 
 
 
 Op. 76: Väinämöisen soitto (Väinämöinen's Call), cantata (for the song and music festival in honor of the Kalevala centenary in Sortavala) for soprano, baritone, mixed choir, and orchestra, with text from the Kalevala (1935); fp. I: Sortavala, 29 June 1935; I–II: 28 February 1936, Armas Järnefelt & Helsinki PO
 
 
 Op. 78: Lauluseppele (Wreath Song), cantata for baritone, male choir, and orchestra, with text by Lauri Pohjanpää; commissioned by YL Male Voice Choir for its 50th anniversary (1938); fp. 26 April 1947, YL Male Voice Choir

Voice and orchestra 
 Op. 9/5: Geisha, for soprano and orchestra, with text by L. Onerva; composer's arrangement of Geisha for soprano and piano (a. 1946); fp. ?
 Op. 24: Sammon ryöstö (The Abduction of The Sampo), symphonic poem for baritone, male choir, and orchestra, with text from the Kalevala (1915); fp. 16 April 1915, Heikki Klemetti, Helsinki PO, & YL Male Voice Choir
 Op. 27/2: Stabat mater: Marian murhe (Mary's Sorrow), for female choir, strings and/or organ, with text by Jacopone da Todi (Finnish trans. by A. Ahlqvist-Oksanen) (1917); fp. 6 April 1917, Suomen Laulu
 Op. 37: , symphonic poem for baritone, male choir, and orchestra, with text by Larin-Kyösti (1917); fp. 8 April 1926, Madetoja, Helsinki PO, & 
 Op. 40: Säestyksellisiä vokaaliteoksia (Vocal Works with Accompianment) (1917–18)
 
 
 
 Op. 42/1: Pellervon laulu, for mixed choir and orchestra ad lib., with text by Eino Leino (c. 1913); fp. ?; see also composer's arrangement for monophonic choir and brass septet
 Op. 42/2: Vapauden aamu, for male choir and orchestra, with text by L. Onerva (1917); fp. ?; see also composer's arrangement for male choir and piano
 Op. 42/5: Mies mieheltä, for male choir and orchestra, with text by Eino Leino; composer's arrangement of Mies mieheltä for male choir and brass ensemble (a. ?); fp. ?
 Op. 46: Väinämöisen kylvö (Väinämöinen Sows the Wilderness), symphonic poem for soprano (or tenor) and orchestra, with text from the Kalevala (1919–20); fp. 28 February 1920, Finnish National Theatre, Madetoja & Helsinki PO, Aino Ackté (soprano)
 Op. 50/4: Oma maa, for mixed choir and orchestra (ad lib.), with text by Samuel Berg ('Samuli Kustaa Kallio'); composer's arrangement of Oma maa for mixed choir (a. 1945); fp. ?
 Op. 58: Kaksi laulua Okon Fuokosta (Two Songs from Okon Fuoko), for soprano and orchestra, with text by Poul Knudsen; excerpted from the stage production's score by the composer (1927); fp. ?; see also composer's arrangement for soprano and piano
 
 
 Op. 61: Pako Egyptiin (The Flight for Egypt), for soprano, mixed choir, organ, and strings, with text by L. Onerva (1924); fp. 7 February 1932, Madetoja & Sekakuoro Sirpaleet, Gösta Stråhle (soprano)
Op. 68: Syksy (Autumn), song cycle for soprano and orchestra, with text by L. Onerva; composer's arrangement of Autumn for soprano and piano (a. 1940); fp. 27 December 1940, Toivo Haapanen, Helsinki PO, & Aune Antti (soprano)
 
 
 
 
 
 

Voice and orchestra (still to source)
 Op. 27/1 - Keväthymni (Spring Hymn), for mixed choir and organ (or harmonium; or piano) with text by L. Onerva (1912)
 Op. 42/4: Vapauden marssi, for voices and piano, with text by Eino Leino (1918); fp. ?
 Op. 72/1: Integer vitae, for mixed choir, woodwinds, and strings, with text by Horace (?); fp. 
 Op. 72/2: Suomen itsenäisyyden kuusi (Finland's Independence), for baritone, mixed choir, and brass ensemble with text by Rudolf Ray (1931; 13 May 1931 Suomen Laulu & the White Guard brass band)

Works for choir a cappella

Female choir 
 Op. 28: Naiskuorolauluja (Songs for Female Choir) (1914–22); fp. ?
 Piika pikkarainen (1914), with text by Valter Juvelius (Valter Juva) 
 Hakamaassa (1914), with text by L. Onerva
 Päivänlasku (1922), with text by L. Onerva

Mixed choir 
 Op. 30a: Sekakuorolauluja (Songs for Mixed Choir), for mixed choir (1916–18); fp. various
 
 
 
 Op. 30b: Sekakuorolauluja (Songs for Mixed Choir), for mixed choir (1911–20); fp. various
 
 
 
 Op. 50: Sekakuorolauluja (Songs for Mixed Choir), for mixed choir (1917–28); fp. various
 
 
 
 
 
 Op. 56: De profundis, for baritone and mixed choir, with text from the Bible, Psalm 130; composer's arrangement of De profundis for baritone and male choir (a. ?); fp. ? 
 
 
 
 
 Op. 57: Kolme kansanlaulua sooloäänelle ja sekakuorolle (Three Folk Songs for Solo Voice and Mixed Choir), for mezzo-soprano and mixed choir (1924–27); fp. various
 
 
 
 Op. 82: Sekakuorolauluja (Songs for Mixed Choir), for mixed choir, with text by L. Onerva (1946); fp. various
 
 
 Op. 13: Sekakuorolauluja (Songs for Mixed Choir) (1910–14)

Male choir 
The complete songs for unaccompanied male choir have been recorded by the YL Male Voice Choir under the Finlandia Label, over three volumes. In the list that follows, '*' signifies a song on Vol. I, '†' a song on Vol. II, and '‡' a song on Vol. III.
 Op. 8: Mieskuorosävellyksiä (Songs for Male Voice Choir) (1908–14); fp. various
 
 
 
 
 
 
 
 
 
 Op. 23: Mieskuorolauluja (Songs for Male Voice Choir), for male choir (and baritone solo, VI, IX–X) (1912–16); fp. various
 
 
 
 
 
 
 
 
 
 Op. 26/3: Majan ma tahtoisin rakentaa (I Would Build a Hut), for tenor and male choir, with text by Larin-Kyösti; composer's arrangement of Majan ma tahtoisin rakentaa for voice and piano (a. 1914); fp. ? *
 Op. 33: Mieskuorolauluja (Songs for Male Voice Choir), for male choir (1916–24); fp. various
 
 
 
 
 
 
 
 
 Op. 39: Mieskuorolauluja (Songs for Male Voice Choir), for male choir (1919–21); fp. various
 
 
 
 
 
 Op. 56: De profundis, for baritone and male choir, with text from the Bible, Psalm 130 (1925); fp. 23 March 1926, Väinö Rautavaara (baritone) & ; see also composer's arrangement for baritone and mixed choir †
 
 
 
 
 Op. 62: Mieskuorolauluja (Songs for Male Voice Choir), for male choir (1925–28); fp. various
 
 
 
 Op. 66: Mieskuorolauluja (Songs for Male Voice Choir), for male choir, with text by Sandor Petöfi (Finnish trans. Otto Manninen) (1924–29); fp. various
 
 
 
 Op. 81: Kuorolauluja (Choir Songs), for male choir (1945–46), fp. various
 
 
 
 
 
 
 
 [WoO]: Land i vår sång (Laulumme maa or The Land In Our Song), for male choir, with text by J. Rundt (Finnish trans. by L. Onerva) (1939); fp. ? ‡
 [WoO]: Paimenen laulu (Shepherd's Song), for male choir, with text by J.H. Erkko (1914); fp. 25 April 1914, YL Male Voice Choir ‡

also on Vol. I: Op. 30b/3 - Tuolla ylhaal asunnoissa (Up There In the Mansions)

also on Vol. II: Op. 57/1 - Läksin minä kesäyönä käymään (One Night in Summer)

also on Vol. III: Lauluseppele (A Garland of Song): 1) Muistojen laulu (Song of Memories), 2) Serenadi (Serenade), and 3) Hymni Isänmaalle (Hymn to the Fatherland)

Works for solo instrument

Piano 
 Op. 5/1: Juhlamarssi (Festive March), for solo piano (a. ?); fp. ?; composer's arrangement of Juhlamarssi for orchestra
 Op. 12: Kuusi pianokappaletta (Six Pieces for Piano) (1911–12); fp. ?; see also composer's arrangement for orchestra of I–V
 
 
 
 
 
 
 Op. 17: Pianosävellyksiä (Piano Pieces) (1912); fp. ?; see also composer's arrangement for strings of I–II
 
 
 
 Op. 21: Pienoiskuvia pianolle (Miniatures for Piano) (1914); fp. ?
 
 
 
 
 
 Op. 31: Pieniä kappaleita pianolle (Four Small Pieces for Piano) (1915); fp. ?
 
 
 
 
 Op. 32: Kaksi melodraama pianon säestyksellä (Two Melodrama with Piano Accompaniment), for reciter and piano (1916); fp. Oulu, 8 October 1916, L. Onerva (reciter) & Madetoja (piano) 
 
 
 Op. 34: Pastoraalisarja pianolle (Pastorale Suite for Piano) (1916); fp. ?; see also composer's arrangement for orchestra of I–IV
 
 
 
 
 Op. 41: Kuoleman puutarha (The Garden of Death or Jardin de la mort), suite for piano (1918, r. 1919); fp. 19 March 1923,  (piano)
 
 
 
 Op. 65: Pianosävellyksiä (Pieces for Piano) (1928–41); fp. ?
 
 
 
 
 
 [WoO]: Kehtolaulu (Berceuse) (1915)

Works for voice and piano

Solo voice 
From 2001–02,  (baritone) and Helena Juntunen (soprano) recorded the complete songs for solo voice and piano under the Ondine label (piano accompaniment: Gustav Djupsjöbacka). In the list that follows, '*' signifies a soprano recording and '†' a baritone recording. Note, however, that many of Madetoja's songs can be sung by either male or female voice.
 Op. 2: Yksinlauluja pianon säestyksellä (Solo Songs with Piano Accompaniment), for voice and piano (1908–15); I–II: fp. 14 December 1908, Elli Salminen (soprano) & Leevi Madetoja (piano); first public performance of Madetoja's works; III–IV: fp. ?
 
 
 
 
 Op. 9: Yksinlauluja pianon säestyksellä (Solo Songs with Piano Accompaniment), for voice and piano, with text by L. Onerva (1909–11); I & III: fp. 31 October 1912, Alma Silventoinen (soprano); II: fp. 16 September 1913, Ida Edkam (soprano) & Karl Ekman (piano); IV–V: fp. ?
 
 
 
 
 
 Op. 16: Yksinlauluja pianon säestyksellä (Solo Songs with Piano Accompaniment), for voice and piano (1912); fp. I: 9 March 1914, Alma Silventoinen (soprano); II–III: fp. ?
 
 
 
 Op. 18: Viisi pohjois-pohjalasia kansanlauluja (Five Folk Songs from Northern Ostrobothnia), for voice (or violin) and piano (1913); fp. ?
 
 
 
 
 
 Op. 20b: Nuorison lauluja pianon säestyksellä (Songs of Youth with Piano Accompaniment), for voice and piano (1913); fp. ?
 
 
 
 
 
 
 Op. 25: Yksinlauluja pianon säestyksellä (Solo Songs with Piano Accompaniment), for voice and piano (1914–15); fp. ?
 
 
 
 
 
 Op. 26: Yksinlauluja pianon säestyksellä (Solo Songs with Piano Accompaniment), for voice and piano (1914–16); fp. ?
 
 
 
 
 
 Op. 36: Sanaton romanssi (Romance Without Words or Romance sans paroles), for voice and piano, with text by Paul Verlaine (Finnish trans. L. Onerva) (1916); fp. 13 July 1916, Helsingin Uusi Musiikkikauppa *
 Op. 42/3: Kansanvalta, for voice and piano, with text by Eino Leino; composer's arrangement of Kansanvalta for male choir and brass septet (a. ?); fp. ?
 Op. 44: Fire Sange (Four Songs or Neljä laulua), for voice and piano (1919); II–IV: fp. 5 March 1920, Alma Kuula (soprano); I: fp. ? 
 
 
 
 
 Op. 49: Yksinlauluja pianon säestyksellä (Solo Songs with Piano Accompaniment), for voice and piano (1920); fp. Turku, 28 February 1920, Väinö Sola (baritone)
 
 
 Op. 58: Kaksi laulua Okon Fuokosta (Two Songs from Okon Fuoko), for soprano and piano, with text by Poul Knudsen (Finnish trans. by Jalmari Lahdensuo); composer's arrangement of the two songs for soprano and orchestra (a. 1945); fp. 10 March 1929, Olli Sikaniemi (soprano)
 
 
 Op. 60: Yksinlauluja pianon säestyksellä (Solo Songs with Piano Accompaniment), for voice and piano, with text by L. Onerva (1921–34); II: fp. 29 October 1924, Alma Kuula (soprano); III: fp. 26 February 1934, Alma Kuula; I: fp. ?
 
 
 
Op. 68: Syksy (Autumn), song cycle for soprano and piano, with text by L. Onerva (1919–34); I: fp. 6 May 1930, Alma Kuula; I–IV: fp. 29 January 1932, Aune Varmavuori-Poijärvi; see also composer's arrangement for soprano and orchestra
 
 
 
 
 
 
 Op. 71: Yksinlauluja pianon säestyksellä (Solo Songs with Piano Accompaniment), for voice and piano (1925–29); fp. ?
 
 
 [WoO]: Kaksi laulua näytelmään Vuoksen varrella (Two Songs from the Play "On the Banks of the Vuoksi River"), for voice and piano, with text by M. Vuori (1910); fp. ? 
 
 
 [WoO]: Land i vår sång (Land in Our Song), with text by J. Rundt (Finnish trans. by L. Onerva) (1939) †
 [WoO]: Puhjetessa kukka puhtain (A Flower Is Purest When Opening), for voice and piano, with text by J.H. Erkko (date: ?) †

Multiple voices 
 Op. 10: Merikoski, cantata (for the 300th anniversary of Oulu City Schools) for mixed choir and piano, with text by V.A. Koskenniemi (1911); fp. Oulu, 29 September 1911, Madetoja conducting; see also composer's arrangement for mixed choir and orchestra
 Op. 42/2: Vapauden aamu, for male choir and piano, with text by L. Onerva; composer's arrangement of Vapauden aamu for male choir and orchestra (a. ?); fp. ?
 Op. 42/5: Mies mieheltä, for male voices (or solo voice) and piano, with text by Eino Leino; composer's arrangement of Mies mieheltä for male choir and brass ensemble (a. ?); fp. ?
 Op. 43: Duettoja pianon säestyksellä (Duets with Piano Accompaniment), for two voices and piano (1919); fp. ?

Works for chamber ensemble 
 Op. 1: Trio viululle, sellolle ja pianolle (Trio for Violin, Cello, and Piano) (1909); fp. I–II: 25 September 1909,  (piano), Viktor Novácek (violin), & Bror Persfelt (cello); I–III: 18 October 1909
 
 
 
 Op. 3: Kaksi kappaletta viululle ja pianolle (Two pieces for Violin and Piano) (1909); fp. I: 7 September 1909, Heikki Kansanen (violin) & Oskar Merikanto (piano); II: 26 September 1910, Viktor Novácek (violin) & Oskar Merikanto (piano)
 
 
 Op. 5/1: Juhlamarssi (Festive March), for seven horns (a. ?); fp. ?; composer's arrangement of Juhlamarssi for orchestra
 Op. 14: Sävellyksiä viululle ja pianolle (Works for Violin and Piano) (1909–12); fp. 11 December 1909, Viktor Novácek (violin) & Karl Ekman (piano) 
 
 
 
 
 
 Op. 19: Sonatiini viululle ja pianolle (Sonatina for Violin and Piano) in B-flat major (1913); fp. 5 July 1913, Eelis Jurva (violin) & Leevi Madetoja (piano)
 
 
 
 Op. 38: Romances intimes, for violin and piano (1917); fp. ?
 
 
 
 
 Op. 42/1: Pellervon laulu, for monophonic choir and brass septet, with text by Eino Leino; composer's arrangement of Pellervon laulu for mixed choir and orchestra (a. ?); fp. ?
 Op. 42/3: Kansanvalta, for male choir and brass septet, with text by Eino Leino (1913); fp. ?; see also composer's arrangement for voice and piano
 Op. 42/5: Mies mieheltä, for male choir and brass ensemble, with text by Eino Leino (1919); fp. ?; see also composer's arrangements for male choir and orchestra and for male voices (or solo voice) and piano
 Op. 51: Lyyrillinen sarja (Lyric Suite), for cello and piano (1922); fp. Kalevala Society Day celebrations, 28 February 1922, Yrjö Selin (cello) & Margaret Kilpinen (piano)
 
 
 
 
Op. 64b: Vanhoja kansantansseja (Old Folk Dances), for clarinet and string quintet (1929); also arranged for clarinet, violin, and piano
 
 
 Op. 67: Sävellyksiä torviseitsikolle (Compositions for Seven Horns) (1912–29)
 
 
 
 Op. 69: Alkusoitto-fantasia, for brass ensemble and percussion (1930); fp: Helsinki Song and Play Festival, 1931
[WoO]: Melodia intima, for violin and piano (1923); fp: Oulu, 22 April 1945, Urpo Pesonen (violin) & Olavi Pesonen (piano)

Stage 
 Op. 6: Alkibiades, incidental music to a play by Eino Leino, for reciter, flute, oboe, cello, and harp (1910); fp. Finnish National Theatre, 27 April 1910 
 
 
 
 
 
 Op. 75a: Elämä on unta (Life Is a Dream), incidental music to a play by Pedro Calderon, for chamber ensemble (1939); fp. Finnish National Theatre, 8 February 1939
 Op. 75b: Kuningas Oidipus (Oedipus Rex), incidental music to a play by Sophocles, for chamber ensemble and choir (1936); fp. Finnish National Theatre, 30 December 1936
 Op. 80: Antonius ja Kleopatra (Antony and Cleopatra), incidental music to a play by William Shakespeare, for chamber ensemble and unison choir (1944); fp. Finnish National Theatre, 28 January 1944

Notes, references, and sources

Notes

References

Sources 

 
Madetoja, Leevi